The 2013 season was BEC Tero Sasana's 17th season in the Thai Premier League.

Players

Squad information

Transfers

In

Out

Loan in

Loan Out

Thai Premier League

Matches

References

External links

2013
Bec Tero Sasana